Transverse artery may refer to

 Suprascapular artery (or transverse scapular artery)
 Transverse cervical artery
 Transverse facial artery